Sleiman Traboulsi (died 16 February 2021) was a Lebanese politician and magistrate. He served as President of the Court of Audit of Lebanon until his appointment as Minister of Electrical and Water Resources by Prime Minister Selim Hoss, where he served from 1998 to 2000.

References

2021 deaths
Government ministers of Lebanon
Year of birth missing
Date of birth missing
Place of birth missing
Place of death missing